Huang Shih-hsu (born 30 November 1975 in Pingtung, Taiwan, old name: Huang Shih-chun and Huang Pei-yi) is a Taiwanese weightlifter representing Chinese Taipei. She participated at the 2010 Asian Games in the 69 kg event finishing 5th. She competed at the 2012 Summer Olympics in the -69 kg event, finishing in 7th place. At the same event in the 2014 Asian Games, she claimed third place.

References 

1975 births
Living people
Taiwanese female weightlifters
Olympic weightlifters of Taiwan
Weightlifters at the 2012 Summer Olympics
Weightlifters at the 2002 Asian Games
Weightlifters at the 2010 Asian Games
Weightlifters at the 2014 Asian Games
Asian Games medalists in weightlifting
Asian Games bronze medalists for Chinese Taipei
Medalists at the 2014 Asian Games
World Weightlifting Championships medalists
20th-century Taiwanese women
21st-century Taiwanese women